Puelia is a genus of African grasses, the only genus in the tribe Atractocarpeae (syn. Puelieae). It belongs to the subfamily Puelioideae, one of the early-diverging lineages in the grasses, but used to be considered a bamboo genus.

 Species
 Puelia ciliata Franch. - Cameroon, Republic of Congo, Gabon, São Tomé, Bioko
 Puelia coriacea Clayton - Zaïre
 Puelia dewevrei De Wild. & T.Durand - Zaïre, Republic of Congo, Gabon
 Puelia olyriformis (Franch.) Clayton - Liberia, Senegal, Sierra Leone, Republic of Congo, Gabon, Tanzania
 Puelia schumanniana Pilg. - Cameroon
 formerly included
see Guaduella 
 Puelia guluensis - Guaduella macrostachys

References

External links
 

Poaceae genera
Flora of Africa
Taxa named by Adrien René Franchet
Puelioideae